Ammi is a genus of about six species of summer-flowering plants in the carrot family Apiaceae. They are native to southern Europe, northern Africa and south-western Asia. They have fern-like leaves and white or cream coloured lace-like flowers borne in branched, rounded umbels.

Ammi spp. (Bishops weed) is prohibited by the Australian New Zealand Food Standards code under standard 1.4.4 due to active constituents:
 furocromine
 coumarin derivatives
 .03% volatile oil (camphor and carvone)
 Fixed oil and protein
 flavonol glycosides (quercetin and kaempferol)

Ammi majus, A. visnaga and their cultivars are frequently seen in gardens where they are grown as annuals or biennials.

Species
The following species are recognised in the genus Ammi:
Ammi huntii H.C.Watson
Ammi majus L.
Ammi trifoliatum (H.C. Watson) Trel.

References

External links
 Jepson Manual Treatment

Apioideae
Apioideae genera